Guilherme Augusto Vieira dos Santos (born 13 April 1995), simply known as Guilherme, is a Brazilian professional footballer who plays as a forward for Fortaleza, on loan from Grêmio.

Career statistics

Honours
Grêmio
Copa do Brasil: 2016

Al-Faisaly
King Cup: 2020–21

References

External links

1995 births
Living people
Brazilian footballers
Brazilian expatriate footballers
Footballers from São Paulo
Association football forwards
Campeonato Brasileiro Série A players
Saudi Professional League players
UAE Pro League players
Grêmio Foot-Ball Porto Alegrense players
Esporte Clube São José players
Botafogo de Futebol e Regatas players
Associação Chapecoense de Futebol players
Coritiba Foot Ball Club players
Sport Club do Recife players
Fortaleza Esporte Clube players
Al-Faisaly FC players
Al Dhafra FC players
Expatriate footballers in Saudi Arabia
Expatriate footballers in the United Arab Emirates
Brazilian expatriate sportspeople in Saudi Arabia
Brazilian expatriate sportspeople in the United Arab Emirates